Harrison Stephens "Hassie" Young (March 23, 1924 – March 23, 2020) was a Canadian ice hockey player with the Edmonton Mercurys. He won a gold medal at the 1950 World Ice Hockey Championships in London, England. The 1950 Edmonton Mercurys team was inducted to the Alberta Sports Hall of Fame in 2011. He also played with the UBC Thunderbirds and Los Angeles Ramblers. Young died on his 96th birthday in 2020.

References

1924 births
2020 deaths
Canadian ice hockey centres
Ice hockey people from Alberta
Ice hockey people from Edmonton
UBC Thunderbirds players